
The following lists events that happened during 1831 in South Africa.

Events
 The first issue of Grahamstown Journal is printed

Births
 5 May – Gezina Susanna Fredricka Wilhelmina du Plessis, who later married South African Republic general and future politician Paul Kruger, and had seven daughters and nine sons with him, is born.

References
See Years in South Africa for list of References

 
South Africa
Years in South Africa